Walter Ashby Plecker (April 2, 1861 – August 2, 1947) was an American physician and public health advocate who was the first registrar of Virginia's Bureau of Vital Statistics, serving from 1912 to 1946. He was a leader of the Anglo-Saxon Clubs of America, a white supremacist organization founded in Richmond, Virginia, in 1922.  He drafted and lobbied for the passage of the Racial Integrity Act of 1924 by the Virginia legislature; it institutionalized the one-drop rule.

Early life and education
Plecker was born in Augusta County, the son of a returned Confederate veteran. Sent to Staunton as a boy, he graduated from Hoover Military Academy in 1880 and obtained a medical degree from the University of Maryland in 1885. He was a devout Presbyterian, and throughout his life he supported the denomination's fundamentalist Southern branch, funding missionaries who believed, as he later would, that God had destroyed Sodom and Gomorrah as punishment for racial intermixing.

Career
Plecker settled in Hampton, Virginia, in 1892, and before his mother's death in 1915, he worked with women of all races and became known for his active interest in obstetrics and public health issues. Plecker educated midwives, invented a home incubator, and prescribed home remedies for infants. His efforts are credited with an almost 50% decline in birthing deaths for black mothers. Plecker became the public health officer for Elizabeth City County in 1902.

In 1912, Plecker became the first registrar of Virginia's newly created Bureau of Vital Statistics, a position he held until 1946. An avowed white supremacist and an advocate of eugenics, he became a leader of the Anglo-Saxon Clubs of America in 1922. He wanted to prevent miscegenation, or marriage between races, and he also thought that a decreasing number of mulattoes, as classified in the census, meant that more of them were passing as white.

With the help of John Powell and Earnest Sevier Cox, Plecker drafted and the state legislature passed the "Racial Integrity Act of 1924". It recognized only two races, "white" and "colored" (black). It essentially incorporated the one-drop rule, classifying any individual with any amount of African ancestry as "colored". This went beyond existing laws, which had classified persons who had one-sixteenth (equivalent to one great-great-grandparent) or less black ancestry as white. In 1967, the United States Supreme Court invalidated the law in Loving v. Virginia.

In particular, Plecker resented African Americans who passed as Native Americans, and he came to firmly believe that the state's Native Americans had been "mongrelized" with its African American population. In fact, since shortly after the Civil War, Native Americans from all over the country had been brought to the Hampton area to be educated alongside blacks, at times inter-marrying, although Hampton's Indian schools had closed down as racial discrimination against Native Americans and the eugenics movement both grew in the state. Plecker refused to recognize the fact that many mixed-race Virginia Indians had maintained their culture and identity as Native Americans over the centuries despite economic assimilation. Plecker ordered state agencies to reclassify most citizens who claimed American Indian identity as "colored", although many Virginian Native Americans continued to live in their communities and maintained their tribal practices. Church records, for instance, continued to identify them as Native Americans. Specifically, Plecker ordered state agencies to reclassify certain families whom he identified by surname, because he decided that they were trying to pass and evade segregation. This remained legal in the South until federal legislation overturned it in the 1960s.

In addition, Plecker lobbied the US Census Bureau to drop the category "mulatto" in the 1930 and later censuses. This deprived mixed-race people of recognition of their identity and it also contributed to a binary culture of hypodescent, in which mixed-race persons were often classified as part of the group with lower social status.

Death
Plecker was hit by a car while crossing a Richmond street, and he died on August 2, 1947, less than a year after his retirement. He is buried in Hollywood cemetery in Virginia beside his wife, who died more than a decade earlier. They had no children. For years Plecker never sought out friends, and he described his hobbies as "books and birds", and he gained a reputation for never smiling.

His obituary in the Richmond Afro-American newspaper was headlined: "Dr. Plecker, 86, Rabid Racist, Killed by Auto".

Plecker's racial policies continue to cause problems for the descendants of what are now sometimes called the First Virginians. Members of eight Virginia-recognized tribes struggle to achieve federal recognition because they cannot prove their continuity of heritage through historic documentation, as federal laws require. First encountering European Americans during the colonial period, the tribes mostly had treaties with the King of England rather than with the United States government. Plecker's policies destroyed and altered records that individuals and families now need in order to prove their cultural continuity as Indians. In 2007, the House of Representatives passed a law to recognize the Virginia tribes at the Federal level. In January 2018, the Senate passed the bill and the president signed it into law.

Quotes
 "Let us turn a deaf ear to those who would interpret Christian brotherhood as racial equality." (1925)
 the "sickening and saddest feature...the considerable number of degenerate white women giving birth to mulatto children" (1925)
 "...insanity, tendency to crime, and immorality are almost surely transmitted to their children, especially when both parents are of the same class. The worst forms of undesirables born amongst us are those whose parents are of different races."

See also
 Racism
 Institutional racism
 One-drop rule
 Hypodescent
 Racial Integrity Act of 1924
 Indian blood

References

External links
 "Kaine and Warner push for federal recognition for 6 Virginia tribes" by Joe Heim, Washington Post March 20, 2017
 "How a long-dead white supremacist still threatens the future of Virginia's Indian tribes" by Joe Heim, Washington Post, July 1, 2015
 "The Black-and-White World of Walter Ashby Plecker" by Warren Fiske, The Virginian-Pilot, August 18, 2004

1861 births
1947 deaths
People from Augusta County, Virginia
Presbyterians from Virginia
American public health doctors
People from Hampton, Virginia
Multiracial affairs in the United States
History of Virginia
Road incident deaths in Virginia
Neo-Confederates